is a North Korean international school in Sakyō-ku, Kyoto, serving junior and senior high school levels.

Notable alumni
Han Ho-gang - a professional footballer
Son Min-chol - a professional footballer

References

External links
 Kyoto Korean Junior-High School 

International schools in Kyoto
North Korean schools in Japan
High schools in Kyoto Prefecture